The Ahang Expressway is an expressway in southeastern Tehran. It runs from the start of Tehran-Mashahd Highway to the Basij Mostazafin Expressway.

Expressways in Tehran
Expressways in Iran